Virginia Herrick (June 13, 1916 – January 29, 2016) was an American film and television actress and an opera soprano.

Filmography

Films
The Frontier Phantom (1952) - Susan
Secrets of Beauty (1951) - Betty Westmore
Montana Desperado (1951) - Sally Wilson
Roar of the Iron Horse (1951) - Carol Lane
Silver Raiders (1950) - Patricia Jones
I Killed Geronimo (1950) - Julie Scott
Vigilante Hideout (1950) - Marigae Sanders

TV
Cowboy G-Men (1953)
The Cisco Kid (1951–1952)
The Gene Autry Show (1950)

References

External links
 
 
 

American film actresses
1916 births
2016 deaths
20th-century American actresses
American operatic sopranos
21st-century American women